Bill O'Connell (born August 22, 1953 in New York City) is a jazz pianist, educator, and bandleader. He is most associated with Latin jazz and hard bop. He studied piano at the Oberlin Conservatory of Music, but has mostly lived in NYC or Long Island. He teaches jazz piano at Mason Gross School for the Arts at the New Brunswick campus of Rutgers University, in New Jersey. He worked with Chet Baker and Sonny Rollins early on in his career. From 1982 to 2017 he has often collaborated and toured with Dave Valentin.

Discography
 1978 Searchig (Inner City Records)
 1988 Love For Sale (Bellaphon, Jazz City)
 1993 Lost Voices (CTI Records)
 1998 The Jazz Slumber Project Directed By Bill O'Connell - Sleep Warm - A Jazz Lullaby Collection (HokanZee Records)
 2001 Black Sand (Random Chance)
 2010 Rhapsody In Blue (Challenge Records)
 2015: The Power Of Two (Panorama)
 2016: Heart Beat (Savant)
 2018: Jazz Latin (Savant)
 2019: Wind Off The Hudson (Savant)
As sideman

With Dave Valentin

Mind Time (GRP, 1987)

References

External links
Bill O'Connell website
[ All Music]

American jazz pianists
American male pianists
Living people
1953 births
20th-century American pianists
21st-century American pianists
20th-century American male musicians
21st-century American male musicians
American male jazz musicians
CTI Records artists